Davydky is a Ukrainian village founded in 1682 located in the Korosten Raion (district) of the Zhytomyr Oblast (province).

References

Korosten Raion
Villages in Korosten Raion
Populated places established in 1682